The following is a timeline of the history of the city of Mashhad, Iran.

Prior to 20th century

 330 BCE - Passage and residence of Alexander the Great during his Persian campaign. Probably the first settlement in the modern city area.
 818 CE - Death of Ali al-Ridha (8th Imam of Twelver Shia Islam) at Sanābādh; Imam Reza shrine established.
 970s-990s - Imam Reza Shrine demolished "in an act of fanaticism" by Ghaznavid Nāṣer-al-dawla Sübüktigin.
 1009 - Imam Reza Shrine rebuilt.
 1121 - Town wall built.
 1161 - Mashhad sacked by Ghuzz Turks.
 1389 - Nearby Tus besieged and "left a heap of ruins" by forces of Timurid Miran Shah; refugees flee to Mashhad.
 1418 - Goharshad Mosque built.
 1426 - Bala-yi sar madrasa built at the Imam Reza shrine.
 1439 - Du-dar madrasa built by Shah Rukh at the Imam Reza shrine.
 1457 - Central Library of Astan Quds Razavi established. 
 1501 - Twelver Shia Islam declared official state religion in Iran, a development beneficial to Mashhad as a holy city (approximate date).
 1507 - Mashhad taken by forces of Uzbek Muhammad Shaybani.
 1544 - Mashhad sacked by Uzbek forces.
 1589 - Mashhad besieged by forces of Shaybanid Abd al-Mumin.
 1598 - Mashhad taken by forces of Abbas I of Persia; Uzbeks defeated.
 1722 - Afghan Abdalis in power.
 1726 - Mashhad besieged by Persian forces.
 1753 - Mashhad besieged by forces of Afghan Ahmad Shah Durrani.
 1803 - Mashhad besieged by forces of Fath Ali Shah.
 1849 - Mashhad taken by forces of Husam al-Saltana.
 1876 - Palace of Abbas Mirza built.
 1889 - British and Russian governments maintain consulates-general.

20th century

 1912 - 29 March: Bombing of city by Russians.
 1918
 Mashhad municipality (administrative entity) formed.
 Mirza Abdol-Raheem Khan Zand Kashef ol-Molk (میرزا عبدالرحیم خان زند کاشف الملک) becomes the city's first mayor.
 1920 - Population: 70,000-80,000 (approximate estimate).
 1925 / 1304 SH - 31 March: Solar Hijri calendar legally adopted in Iran.
 1949 - Razavi University established.
 1959 - Nader Shah Mausoleum erected.
 1963 - Population: 312,186 (estimate).
 1964 - Astan Quds Razavi Central Museum inaugurated.
 1966 - Mashhad railway station opens.
 1968 -  (cinema) established.
 1970 -  (cinema) established.
 1971 -  (cinema) established.
 1980 -  (zoo) established.
 1982 - Population: 1,120,000 (estimate).
 1983 - Samen Stadium opens.
 1995 - Central Library of Astan Quds Razavi new building opens.
 1996 - Population: 1,887,405.

21st century

 2004
 Proma Hypermarket in business.
 City becomes part of the newly formed Razavi Khorasan Province.
 2011
 Mashhad Urban Railway begins operating.
 Siah Jamegan Aboumoslem Khorasan F.C. (football club) formed.
  (velodrome) opens.
 Imam Reza Stadium construction begins.
 Population: 2,766,258.
 2013 - 14 June: Local election held.
 2014
 Sowlat Mortazavi becomes mayor.
 City becomes part of newly formed national administrative Region 5.

See also
 
 
 Timelines of other cities in Iran: Bandar Abbas, Hamadan, Isfahan, Kerman, Qom, Shiraz, Tabriz, Tehran, Yazd

References

This article incorporates information from the Persian Wikipedia.

Bibliography

in English
 
 
 
 
  1993 reprint
 
 
  (Article about the shrine)

in other languages
  1883-1885

External links

 Items related to Mashhad, various dates (via Qatar Digital Library)
 
 Items related to Mashhad, various dates (via Europeana)
 Items related to Mashhad, various dates (via Digital Public Library of America)
 

Years in Iran
Mashhad
Mashhad
mashhad